The 1997 NHK Trophy was the final event of six in the 1997–98 ISU Champions Series, a senior-level international invitational competition series. It was held in Nagano on November 27–30. Medals were awarded in the disciplines of men's singles, ladies' singles, pair skating, and ice dancing. Skaters earned points toward qualifying for the 1997–98 Champions Series Final.

Results

Men

Ladies

Pairs

Ice dancing

External links
 1997 NHK Trophy

Nhk Trophy, 1997
NHK Trophy